Elsa Jacquemot (born 3 May 2003) is a French tennis player.
She has career-high WTA rankings of 143 in singles and 325 in doubles.

Jacquemot won the girls' singles competition of the 2020 French Open.

Professional career
Jacquemot made her WTA Tour main-draw debut at the 2020 Lyon Open in the doubles draw, partnering Estelle Cascino.

She was awarded a wildcard into the women's main draw of the 2020 French Open, but lost to qualifier Renata Zarazúa in the first round. Seeded third, she then entered and won the girls' singles competition at the 2020 French Open. She participated also in the ladies' doubles main draw as a wildcard, partnering with Elixane Lechemia.

She was awarded a wildcard in the main draw at the 2021 French Open in ladies' singles but lost again in the first round. She also participated for the second consecutive year in the French Open as a wildcard, partnering again with Elixane Lechemia.

In 2022, she was awarded a third wildcard into the French Open where she defeated Heather Watson for her first major match win. She also entered into the doubles tournament as a wildcard, partnering Séléna Janicijevic.

Performance timeline

Singles

Doubles

ITF Circuit finals

Singles: 3 (1 title, 2 runner–ups)

Doubles: 1 (runner–up)

Junior Grand Slam tournament finals

Girls' singles: 1 (title)

Notes

References

External links
 
 

2003 births
Living people
French female tennis players
French Open junior champions
Grand Slam (tennis) champions in girls' singles
21st-century French women